Khandapada (Sl. No.: 120) is a Vidhan Sabha constituency of Nayagarh district, Odisha.

This constituency includes Khandapada, Khandapada block and Bhapur block.

Elected Members

Fifteen elections were held between 1951 and 2014.
Elected members from the Khandapada constituency are:
2019: (113): Soumya Ranjan Patnaik (BJD)
2014: (120): Anubhav Patnaik (BJD)
2009: (120): Siddharth Sekhar Singh (BJD)
2004: (63): Bijayalaxmi Pattnaik  (Independent)
2000: (63): Bijayalaxmi Pattnaik (BJD)
1995: (63): Bibhuti Bhusan Singh Mardaraj (Congress)
1990: (63): Arun Kumar Pattnaik (Janata Dal)
1985: (63): Bibhuti Bhusan Singh Mardaraj (Congress)
1980: (63): Bibhuti Bhusan Singh Mardaraj (Independent)
1977: (63): Satyasundar Mishra (Independent)
1974: (63): Satyasundar Mishra (Indpependent)
1971: (57): Bansidhar Pattnaik (Indpependent)
1967: (57): Harihar Singh Mardaraj Bharamarbar Ray (Congress)
1961: (83): Harihar Singh Mardaraj Bharamarbar Ray (Congress)
1957: (56): Harihar Singh Mardaraj Bharamarbar Ray (Congress)
1951: (94): Harihar Singh Mardaraj Bharamarbar  Ray (Independent)

2019 Election Result

2014 Election Results
In 2014 election, Biju Janata Dal candidate Anubhav Patnaik defeated Aama Odisha Party candidate Soumya Ranjan Patnaik by a margin of 601 votes.

2009 General Election Results
In 2009 general election, Biju Janata Dal candidate Siddharth Sekhar Singh defeated Indian National Congress candidate Soumya Ranjan Patnaik by a margin of 16,814 votes.

Notes

References

Assembly constituencies of Odisha
Nayagarh district